Desperate Undertaking is  a historical novel by British writer Lindsey Davis, the tenth  in her Flavia Albia series. It was published in the UK on 7 April 2022 by Hodder & Stoughton and in the United States on 27 July 2022 by Minotaur Books.

The tale is set in Rome in late December 89 AD, set in and around the Field of Mars, and involving murders among the theatrical community. It is divided into parts, of varying lengths, with titles "Laureolus", "Pasiphae", "Oedipus Rex", "Medea", "Selurus the bandit king of Sicily", "Orpheus or possibly Daedalus", "Aeschylus", "Jason" and "The Girl from Londinium".

The cover of the first UK hardback edition shows a damaged bas-relief carving of a seated man contemplating a theatrical mask which he holds in his outstretched hand. The image is of part of "Relief of a seated poet (Menander) with masks of New Comedy, 1st century B.C.–early 1st century A.D.", held by the Princeton University Art Museum. The American cover shows a girl in a white and purple tunic looking towards a Roman theatre while clutching a large dagger.

References
 

Novels set in ancient Rome
British historical novels
Flavia Albia novels
2022 British novels
21st-century British novels
Hodder & Stoughton books
Novels set in the 1st century
68